Preview may refer to:

Theatre, film, television
 Preview (subscription service), an early subscription television service in the United States
 Preview (theatre), a public performance of a theatrical show before the official opening
 Preview screening or test screening, a showing of a film or TV show before general release in order to gauge audience reaction
 Sneak preview, an unannounced film screening before formal release and after a preview screening
 Trailer (film) or preview, an advertisement for a film that will be exhibited in the future at a motion picture theater

Computing
 Preview (computing), an on-screen view of content as it will look when finalized or printed
 Preview (macOS), a macOS application for displaying images and PDF documents
 Technical preview, another name for the beta phase of the software release cycle

Recorded music
 DJ Drama Presents: The Preview, a mixtape by Ludacris and DJ Drama
 "Preview", the 13th and final song on Built to Spill's 1994 album, There's Nothing Wrong with Love
 Preview (EP), the second EP by Australian singer-songwriter Kym Campbell, released in 2010
 The Preview (EP), a 2010 EP by Chiddy Bang

See also
 Foresight (disambiguation)
 Precognition